World Financial Center may refer to:

China
 Chongqing World Financial Center
 Shanghai World Financial Center
 Tianjin World Financial Center

United States
 Brookfield Place (New York City), formerly the World Financial Center complex
 200 Liberty Street, formerly One World Financial Center
 225 Liberty Street, formerly Two World Financial Center
 200 Vesey Street, formerly Three World Financial Center
 250 Vesey Street, formerly Four World Financial Center

See also 
World Trade Center (disambiguation)